Bjarne Arentz (born 2 December 1928) is a Norwegian alpine skier. He was born in Oslo. He participated at the 1948 Winter Olympics in  Saint Moritz, where he competed in downhill, slalom and alpine combined.

He became Norwegian champion in alpine combined in 1946.

References

1928 births
Living people
Alpine skiers from Oslo
Norwegian male alpine skiers
Olympic alpine skiers of Norway
Alpine skiers at the 1948 Winter Olympics